The De La Salle Green Archers (also known simply as the Green Archers) are the men's varsity teams representing De La Salle University in the Philippines. The women's varsity teams are generally referred to as the De La Salle Lady Archers. The school's varsity teams participate in the University Athletic Association of the Philippines, among others. La Salle is represented in the high school level by De La Salle Zobel, and are known as the Zobel Junior Archers.

Athletic history

In 1924, De La Salle College (DLSC) became a pre-war founding member of the National Collegiate Athletic Association (NCAA). Irish-American Br. Celba John Lynam, FSC organized the first De La Salle sports teams. The Irish colors of Green and White were chosen as the official LaS colors; Green was inspired by the national color of Ireland, where the original founding fathers of the De La Salle Christian Brothers originated from, while White represents the Philippines as the Pearl of the Orient Seas. The pre-war NCAA was the first and oldest collegiate athletic association in the Philippines composed of De La Salle College, San Beda College, University of the Philippines, University of Santo Tomas, Institute of Accounts (now as Far Eastern University), National University, Ateneo de Manila and University of Manila.

The De La Salle basketball players were first referred to as the Green Archers during the basketball games of NCAA Season 16 (1939–40), where De La Salle made its way to the finals and won against eventual archrival Ateneo in an upset for its first basketball championship title in the seniors' division of the NCAA. Accordingly, the news reporters who were covering De La Salle games at that time coined the team the "Green Archers" due in part to the De La Salle players' accurate shooting skills. The De La Salle Alumni Association (DLSAA) has three official Green Archer mascots that are – Gordo, Flaco, and Sally. The DLSU Green Archer statue standing in the central plaza was done by Ed Castrillo in 1985. It was first exhibited during the celebration of the Diamond Jubilee in 1986. The Green Archer is the traditional university mascot, the varsity teams of De La Salle University are collectively referred to as the Green Archers, however, each team has a specific moniker depending on what sport they play.

De La Salle participated in the NCAA for 57 years until the 1980–81 NCAA Season winning five NCAA General Championships in the process (1972–73, 1974–75, 1976–77, 1977–78, and 1980–81). La Salle announced its decision to withdraw from the NCAA in September 1980. The high school (juniors' division) counterpart were the Greenies from De La Salle College High School until 1968 when the then-high school in Taft Avenue, Manila was phased out and transferred to the La Salle Green Hills (LSGH) campus in Ortigas Avenue, Mandaluyong City, Metro Manila. The Greenies had won two General Championships under DLSC. La Salle Green Hills was established in 1959 and was eventually made the high school counterpart of De La Salle College, and inherited the Greenies moniker. LSGH won eight NCAA General Championships until 1981 when La Salle withdrew from the NCAA.

From 1981 through 1985 the school participated in the Philippine Integrated Colleges and Universities Athletic Association (PICUAA), invitational meets, Interclub tournaments, and the National Open. De La Salle University (DLSU) then joined the University Athletic Association of the Philippines (UAAP) in 1986. La Salle chose the newly-established De La Salle Zobel (DLSZ) as their UAAP Juniors counterpart and adopted the Junior Archers moniker. LSGH was later asked by De La Salle–College of Saint Benilde to compete as their high school junior team in the NCAA when it applied and was accepted in 1998. Ever since joining the UAAP in 1986, DLSU has won three UAAP General Championships – Season 75 (2012–13), Season 76 (2013–14), and Season 78 (2015–16), giving the university a combined eight General Championship titles in the seniors' division in the NCAA and UAAP. Notable alumni Lasallian athletes are inducted into the DLSAA Sports Hall of Fame.

Sports traditions

Alma Mater Hymn
The DLS school battle song was made by two De La Salle Christian Brothers - Br. Stephen Malachy FSC and Br. Bonaventure Richards FSC. The traditional battle song is sung by all Lasallian students and alumni during sports competitions, alumni parties, and school-led gatherings, with the gesture of continuously raising a tightly-clenched fist in the air and doing three close-fisted air-pump salutes as its grand finale. The melody originated in an American Lasallian school - San Joaquin Memorial High School in Fresno, California; the lyrics were modified, but the tune and beat remained the same.
The DLS battle song was first sung during a DLS graduation event in 1964. It was adopted by the DLSC Green Archer basketball team and the DLS Yell Command Spirit Team in 1965 and eventually became the traditional alma mater hymn of De La Salle College together later on with the 16 Lasallian educational institutions of the Philippines. It was a very defiant DLSC Yell Command Spirit Team who initiated the singing of the DLS Alma Mater Song after suffering a bitter 0-win NCAA basketball season. The DLSC Yell Command Spirit Team began the tradition of proudly singing their DLS alma mater battle song after the end of every sports competition, be it in a glorious victory or a humbling honorable defeat. The vintage DLS tradition was emulated by their NCAA school rivals and years later on emulated again by all the UAAP competing schools when the DLSU Green Archers competed in the fray of rival universities.   De La Salle College owns the distinction of being the first and only school in any Philippine collegiate sports league to proudly sing its DLS Alma Mater Hymn after the end of each sports match in the old pre-martial law NCAA – a practice imitated by several competing schools in the NCAA and the UAAP.

Cheerleading
The DLSU AN1MO! Squad was originally known in its pre-war NCAA years as Br. John Lynam's 1924 LaS Rah! Rah! Boys, then in 1926 as the LSC Yell Commanders. The LaS Spirit Team was one of the first and oldest Collegiate Cheerleading Spirit teams in the Philippines. It was renamed decades later on as the post-war DLSC Cheerleading Squad, then in the late 1980s as the DLSU Pep Squad until 2008, when it was renamed later on by Br. Bernard Oca, FSC as the present DLSU AN1MO! Squad. The DLSU Green & White Spirit Team has since then won five cheer dance podium finishes in the span of its UAAP participation, in 1994, 1996, 1998, 2011, and 2013. The original Lasallian cheerleading spirit team was initially established in 1924 with 4 LaS Rah!Rah!Boys and formally in 1926 as the pre-war pioneers of the LSC Yell Command. Brother John Lynam's pre-war LaS Rah!Rah!Boys, as well as his LSC and DLSC Yell Command up to Brother Bernard Oca's present DLSU AN1MO! Squad has been continuously cheerleading for  years. In 1941, the DLSC Green & White yearbook featured a vintage black and white photo of four elementary school boys wearing their Green Archer costumes who formed the first Green Archer Grade School mascot, cheerleading squad. The original members of the collegiate De La Salle cheerleading squad were all male until the inclusion of its first female cheerleaders in the early pre-martial law years in the 1970s. The DLSC cheerleading squad is proud to be the first spirit team in both the NCAA and UAAP to break from its all-male traditions and be more inclusive in having female cheerleaders in the DLSC Yell Command Spirit Team. The first female DLSC cheerleaders were then cross-enrollees from nearby St. Scholastica's College, Manila before De La Salle College turned co-educational in 1973. During De La Salle's pre-war NCAA years, Lasallites used to sing several pre-war vintage battle songs such as the "Men of La Salle!", "On Into The Fight – Green Archer Battle Song", "Cheer! Cheer! For O'l De La Salle", the "De La Salle Victory Song", "Go La Salle Fight Song", and several more.

Sports

Basketball
La Salle has a total of 27 basketball championship titles in the NCAA and UAAP combined. Under its membership stint in the NCAA, La Salle won 11 championship titles – five under the men's division, and six under the juniors' division. In the UAAP, the school has 16 championship titles – nine in the men's division, five in the women's division, and two in the juniors' division.

Men's basketball

La Salle has five NCAA basketball titles – 1939, 1947, 1956, 1971, and 1974. The Green Archers won the coveted National Seniors Open Championship, a league participated by top commercial and college teams, twice in 1939 and 1949. After bolting out of the NCAA in 1981, it participated in various tournaments. The Green Archers won the 1983 PABL Championship and 1983 National Open title. La Salle has won three inter-collegiate titles. The school won the 1988 Philippine Intercollegiate Championship. This was later reformatted to become the Collegiate Champions League (CCL), which then became the current Philippine Collegiate Championship League (PCCL) with La Salle winning the  championship in 2008 and 2013.

The Green Archers have won nine UAAP basketball titles – 1989, 1990, 1998, 1999, 2000, 2001, 2007, 2013, and 2016. La Salle's basketball program is known for having won four straight UAAP championship titles from 1998 to 2001. The Green Archers are also known for sharing a rivalry with other competitive teams in the UAAP, especially with the Ateneo Blue Eagles, UST Growling Tigers, and FEU Tamaraws. La Salle defeated UST in overtime during the UAAP Season 76 basketball championship in 2013. Its most recent championship was the 2016 UAAP Season 79 title, where La Salle swept Ateneo during the best-of-three series. Prior to the start of the UAAP season, the Green Archers participate in the Filoil EcoOil Preseason Cup where they have won four titles, the latest being the 2016 championship. The Green Archers participated in the Buddha Light International Association (BLIA) Cup, where they last won the championship in 2017. The Green Archers have also participated in the PBA D-League Aspirants' Cup as EcoOil-La Salle, where they won their first title in 2022.

La Salle's basketball program has produced a crop of national players and coaches. Its players include Enrique "Totit" Valles, Leo Prieto, Bob Keesey,  Ramoncito Campos, Valentin "Tito" Eduque, Eddie Decena, Manolet Araneta, Martin Urra, Kurt Bachmann, Joe Laganson, Guillermo "Billy" Manotoc, Mike Bilbao, Julian "Julie" Lim, Doy Escober, Lim Eng Beng, Ricardo Brown, Franz Pumaren, Dindo Pumaren, Jun Limpot, Mark Telan, Don Allado, Ren-Ren Ritualo, Mike Cortez, Mark Cardona, JV Casio, Robert Bolick, Jeron Teng, and Ben Mbala. Its homegrown Lasallian coaches have included Chito Calvo, Leo Prieto, Rogelio Lao, Tito Eduque, Derrick Pumaren, Jong Uichico, Juno Sauler, Dindo Pumaren, and Franz Pumaren who holds the distinction of having won five UAAP basketball championship titles with the Green Archers.

Notable players
 Gee Abanilla
 Teddy Alfarero
 Don Allado
 Alfie Almario
 Manuel Araneta, Jr.
 Ryan Arana
 Simon Atkins
 Kurt Bachmann
 Justine Baltazar
 Robert Bolick
 Ricardo Brown
 Junjun Cabatu
 Ramon Campos, Jr.
 Johnedel Cardel
 Mark Cardona
 JVee Casio
 Mike Cortez
 Ferdinand Damanik
 Eduardo Decena
 Yves Dignadice
 Valentin Eduque
 Nico Elorde
 Jerwin Gaco
 Alfonzo Gotladera
 Mon Jose
 Lim Eng Beng 
 Jun Limpot
 Noli Locsin
 Rico Maierhofer
 Ben Mbala
 Jason Perkins
 Leo Prieto
 Derrick Pumaren
 Franz Pumaren
 Dindo Pumaren
 LA Revilla
 Ren-Ren Ritualo
 Adonis Santa Maria
 Juno Sauler
 Carlo Sharma
 Mac Tallo
 Tyrone Tang
 Mark Telan
 Jeron Teng
 Norbert Torres
 Abu Tratter
 Jong Uichico
 Martin Urra
 Arnold Van Opstal
 Pocholo Villanueva
 Almond Vosotros
 Jason Webb
 Willy Wilson
 Joseph Yeo
 Ervic Vijandre

Women's basketball
The Lady Archers have won a total of five championship titles. They were UAAP title holders from 1999 through 2002. Their most recent championship was in UAAP Season 76 in 2013.

Football
La Salle has a total of 67 football championship titles in the NCAA and UAAP combined. Under its membership stint in the NCAA, La Salle won 51 championship titles – 21 under the men's division, and 30 under the juniors' division. In the UAAP, the school has 16 championship titles – four in the men's division, 11 in the women's division, and one in the juniors' division.

Men's football
De La Salle has the most number of football championships in Philippine NCAA history with a total of 21 collegiate championships. The high school team has 30 championship trophies.  The school's golden era of football was from 1932 through 1940 when La Salle was the Senior division NCAA champion 9 times. La Salle was also the NCAA Senior division champion from 1971 through 1977. Notable players include Roderico Reyes, Joey Veloso, Johnny Sun, Julian "Julep" Lao, Inaki Vicente, Mike Moran, Danny Moran, Dicky Moran, Robs Delfino, Iñaki Alvarez, Ike Monserrat, Babes Tan, Christian Lozano, Alvin Ocampo, and Albie Aparilla. The Juniors team was champion from 1937 to 1941 and from 1971 through 1976.  The school was  NCAA double champions in both Junior and Senior divisions from 1937 through 1940. La Salle was also NCAA double champion in both Junior and Senior divisions from 1971 through 1976. DLSU left the NCAA after the 1980–81 Season and eventually transferred to the UAAP.

In the UAAP, the men's team has won four titles. The DLSU men's football team captured its first-ever solo UAAP championship via a sweep in UAAP Season 57. The team was coached by Hans Smit.

In UAAP Season 54, DLSU was declared joint UAAP champions with UST. 

In UAAP Season 56, La Salle lost to UST 4–0 in the championship game. The following year in UAAP Season 57, La Salle dethroned UST to win its second UAAP championship title.

In UAAP Season 58, the team lost to Ateneo de Manila University in the Finals. 

In UAAP Season 59, DLSU won the Finals against Ateneo 5–1.

DLSU successfully defended its crown in UAAP Season 60 and captured back-to-back championships.

Women's football

Volleyball
La Salle has a total of 42 volleyball championship titles in the NCAA and UAAP combined. Under its membership stint in the NCAA, La Salle won 12 championship titles – four under the men's division, seven under the juniors' division, and one under the women's division. In the UAAP, the school has 30 championship titles – two in the men's division, 11 in the women's division, seven in the boys' division, and 10 in the girls' division.

Men's volleyball
The men's volleyball team has won a total of six championship titles. La Salle was 4-peat NCAA men's champions from Seasons 53 to 56 (1977–1980). The Green Spikers were also UAAP men's champions in Seasons 64 and 66.

Women's volleyball

Beach volleyball
The Lady Green Spikers were champions of the UAAP Season 78 Beach Volleyball tournament after defeating FEU in two finals games.

Softball
La Salle has a total of 11 softball championship titles during their membership stint in the NCAA. In the seniors' division, La Salle won three titles. The Green Archers won their first NCAA softball championship in 1974, and were also back-to-back champions in 1976 and 1977. In the juniors' division, La Salle won eight titles. DLSC High School were back-to-back champions in 1966 and 1967. La Salle Green Hills then won five straight championships from 1970 to 1974. The last championship from LSGH came in 1980 before La Salle left the NCAA in 1981. The sport was discontinued in the NCAA in 1986.

Baseball
La Salle has a total of nine championship titles in UAAP Baseball. In UAAP Season 78, La Salle ended a 13-year title drought and beat Ateneo, who were the defending champions. La Salle won their fifth championship title after defeating Ateneo in three games in the UAAP Season 81 Finals. In the juniors' division, the De La Salle Zobel baseball team has won four titles. They won their first title in UAAP Season 74 when baseball was introduced in the juniors' division. They also won back-to-back titles in UAAP Season 76 and UAAP Season 77. Their last championship was in UAAP Season 79.

Tennis
La Salle has a total of 29 tennis championship titles in the NCAA and UAAP. Since 1953 when the school won its first NCAA trophy, the men's team has won 14 titles. The Green Archers last won the championship in 2012 (UAAP Season 74). They defeated the NU Bulldogs 3–2 in the finals, completed a tournament sweep and posted an 11–0 win–loss record. 

The women's team has won six titles since the introduction of tennis in the women's division in UAAP Season 64. They won their first title in 2003 (UAAP Season 65) and were champions from 2003 through 2005. In 2005 (UAAP Season 67), the Lady Archers defeated Ateneo in the finals. The Lady Archers were also back-to-back champions in UAAP Season 72 and UAAP Season 73, where they defeated the UST Tigresses. DLSU successfully defended the championship the following year. In UAAP Season 75, DLSU regained the championship from UST and completed their bid for a sixth overall title. In the juniors' division, La Salle won nine NCAA championship titles.

Table tennis
La Salle has a total of 17 championship titles in UAAP Table Tennis. In the seniors' division, La Salle has won 12 table tennis championships, and posted a back-to-back double championship in 2014 and 2015. In the men's division, the school took home their first trophy in 1997. The Green Paddlers were also champions in UAAP Seasons 76 to 78 (2013–2015). In the women's division, La Salle won their first title in 2004 and were champions in UAAP Seasons 77 to 80 (2014–2017). Ian Lariba led the Lady Paddlers to multiple UAAP titles and won multiple MVPs. She competed in the 2016 Summer Olympics and was the Philippine Olympic Team flag bearer. In April 2019, Lariba's jersey was retired and raised to the La Salle rafters at the Enrique M. Razon Sports Center, the first time that DLSU retired a jersey of an athlete from a non-team sport. The Lady Paddlers won their seventh championship in UAAP Season 85. In the juniors' division, La Salle has won five titles, including double championships in UAAP Season 78 and UAAP Season 82. The Junior Green Paddlers won their third title in UAAP Season 85. La Salle holds the distinction of being the first team to win the gold in all the four gender groups of a particular UAAP sport through its table tennis teams in 2015.

Badminton
La Salle has a total of six championship titles in collegiate badminton. The men's badminton team captured their first and only championship title in UAAP Season 70. The women's badminton team were title holders in UAAP Season 65 and back-to-back champions in UAAP Season 67 and UAAP Season 68. They secured their fourth championship in UAAP Season 72, and their fifth championship in UAAP Season 80.

Swimming
La Salle has a total of 30 swimming championship titles in the NCAA and UAAP. In the seniors' division, La Salle has won 12 men's titles and five women's titles. The school won its first and only title in the NCAA in 1935. The last title of the men's team came in UAAP Season 74 in 2011. The men's team were twice 3-peat champions from UAAP Seasons 53 to 55 (1990–1992) and UAAP Season 63 to 65 (2000–2002). They were also back-to-back champions in UAAP Season 57 and UAAP Season 58. The women's team won their first title in UAAP Season 53 and were back-to-back champions in UAAP Season 65 and UAAP Season 66. In UAAP Season 85, the Lady Green Tankers ended their 19-year championship drought and won their fifth title.

La Salle had swimming champions in the 1930s featuring the Von Giese brothers. Eric Buhain was an accomplished swimmer at an early age. He was a multiple gold medalist in the 1985, 1991, and 1993 SEA Games, and represented the Philippines in the 1992 Summer Olympics. Actor and model Enchong Dee led the Green Archers to the UAAP Season 72 title and in the process won seven gold medals in the 800 and 1,500 meter freestyle, 200 and 400 meter individual medley, as well as 50, 100, and 200 meter butterfly. He is also a 3-time UAAP MVP. In the juniors' division, La Salle has nine NCAA titles and four UAAP titles.

Track and field
La Salle has a total of 27 track and field championship titles in the NCAA and UAAP. La Salle has won 13 men's track and field collegiate titles. From 1972 through 1978, the school won seven consecutive championships. During that run, Arthur Pons, the Philippine Decathlon champion, was a member of the 1972–1973 track teams. The last title came in 2004. In the juniors' division, La Salle won 14 titles in the NCAA.

Taekwondo and Poomsae
La Salle has a total of nine championship titles in UAAP Taekwondo. The men's Taekwondo team has won four titles – 1998, 1999, 2011, and 2013. The women's Taekwondo team has won five titles – 1998, 1999, 2001, 2002, and 2012. Stephen Fernandez won the Taekwondo bronze medal during the 1992 Barcelona Olympics. In UAAP Poomsae, La Salle has won three championship titles. The first championship came in UAAP Season 79. La Salle then won back-to-back titles in UAAP Season 81 and UAAP Season 82.

Judo
The men's team won their first UAAP Judo title in 1992. In 2013, the women's team won their first championship and ended the school's 21-year title drought.

Notable players
 Edu Manzano – Judo
 Monsour del Rosario – Taekwondo

Chess
La Salle has a total of 20 championship titles in chess. In the seniors' division, La Salle has won seven men's titles and nine women's titles. The school holds the longest winning streak in UAAP Chess Championship history. La Salle was men's UAAP Chess 6-peat champions from 1999 through 2004. John Paul Gomez was Grandmaster in the 2008 World Chess Olympiad. Gomez won five MVP awards for chess and was also the 2009 UAAP Athlete of the Year. The women's team were 4-peat champions from UAAP Seasons 73 to 76. In the juniors' division, La Salle won four consecutive championships in NCAA Seasons 53 to 56 (1977–1980).

Seniors division
Presently, De La Salle University has won 184 collegiate championships in the men's and women's divisions combined. This includes championships while competing in the NCAA from 1924 through 1981 and UAAP from 1986 through the present. La Salle also has a total of eight General Championship titles, having won five in the NCAA and three in the UAAP. In the seniors' division, the school has a rich legacy in basketball (19 titles), chess (16 titles), football/soccer (36 titles), swimming (16 titles), track and field (13 titles), tennis (20 titles), table tennis (11 titles), and volleyball (18 titles).

The men's basketball team were 4-peat champions (1998–2001), chess team 6-peat champions (1999–2004), football/soccer team 9-peat champions (1932–1940), swimming team twice 3-peat champions (1990–1992 and 2000–2002), track and field team 7-peat champions (1972–1978), tennis team 3-peat champions (1956–1958), table tennis team 3-peat champions (2013–2015), and volleyball team 4-peat champions (1977–1980).

The university became co-educational in 1973. The women's basketball team were 4-peat champions (1999–2002), chess team 4-peat champions (2011–2014), football/soccer team 4-peat champions (2003–2006), tennis team 3-peat champions (2003–2005), table tennis team 4-peat champions (2014–2017) and volleyball team thrice 3-peat champions (2004–2006, 2011–2013, and 2016–2018). The De La Salle men's and women's basketball teams are the first and only 3-peat basketball champions in the same period (1999–2001) in the Final Four era of the UAAP.

Men's sports
 Badminton (1) – 2007–08
 Baseball (5) – 1995–96, 1999–00, 2002–03, 2015–16, 2018–19
 Basketball (14) – 1939–40, 1947–48, 1956–57, 1971–72, 1974–75, 1989–90, 1990–91, 1998–99, 1999–00, 2000–01, 2001–02, 2007–08, 2013–14, 2016–17
 Chess (7) – 1999–00, 2000–01, 2001–02, 2002–03, 2003–04, 2004–05, 2014–15
 Football (25) – 1932–33, 1933–34, 1934–35, 1935–36, 1936–37, 1937–38, 1938–39, 1939–40, 1940–41, 1947–48, 1949–50, 1951–52, 1952–53, 1965–66, 1966–67, 1971–72, 1972–73, 1974–75, 1975–76, 1976–77, 1977–78, 1991–92, 1994–95, 1996–97, 1997–98
 Judo (1) – 1991–92
 Softball (3) – 1974–75, 1976–77, 1977–78
 Swimming (12) – 1935–36, 1988–89, 1990–91, 1991–92, 1992–93, 1994–95, 1995–96, 2000–01, 2001–02, 2002–03, 2009–10, 2011–12
 Table Tennis (5) – 1997–98, 2000–01, 2013–14, 2014–15, 2015–16
 Taekwondo (4) – 1997–98, 1998–99, 2010–11, 2013–14
 Tennis (14) – 1953–54, 1954–55, 1956–57, 1957–58, 1958–59, 1965–66, 1980–81, 1990–91, 1994–95, 1995–96, 2003–04, 2005–06, 2008–09, 2011–12
 Track and Field (13) – 1925–26, 1926–27, 1933–34, 1935–36, 1972–73, 1973–74, 1974–75, 1975–76, 1976–77, 1977–78, 1978–79, 1980–81, 2004–05
 Volleyball (6) – 1977–78, 1978–79, 1979–80, 1980–81, 2001–02, 2003–04

Women's sports
 Badminton (5) – 2002–03, 2004–05, 2005–06, 2009–10, 2017–18
 Basketball (5) – 1999–00, 2000–01, 2001–02, 2002–03, 2013–14
 Beach Volleyball (1) – 2015–16
 Chess (9) – 2002–03, 2008–09, 2010–11, 2011–12, 2012–13, 2013–14, 2015–16, 2017–18, 2018–19
 Football (11) – 1995–96, 1998–99, 1999–00, 2002–03, 2003–04, 2004–05, 2005–06, 2009–10, 2016–17, 2017–18, 2018–19
 Judo (1) – 2013–14
 Swimming (5) – 1990–91, 1996–97, 2002–03, 2003–04, 2022–23
 Table Tennis (7) – 2004–05, 2012–13, 2014–15, 2015–16, 2016–17, 2017–18, 2022–23
 Taekwondo (5) – 1997–98, 1998–99, 2000–01, 2001–02, 2012–13
 Tennis (6) – 2002–03, 2003–04, 2004–05, 2009–10, 2010–11, 2012–13
 Volleyball (12) – 1975–76, 1999–00, 2003–04, 2004–05, 2005–06, 2008–09, 2010–11, 2011–12, 2012–13, 2015–16, 2016–17, 2017–18

Coed sports
 Poomsae (3) – 2016–17, 2018–19, 2019–20
 Street dance (4) – 2010–11, 2011–12, 2016–17, 2018–19

Juniors division
The junior teams representing La Salle have won 120 high school championships including 10 NCAA General Championship titles. The first two General Championships were won by DLSC High School and the other eight were won by La Salle Green Hills (LSGH). During their membership stint in the NCAA, La Salle's juniors team was represented first by DLSC High School from 1924 to 1968, followed by La Salle Green Hills from 1969 up to 1981 when La Salle withdrew from the league. Presently in the UAAP, La Salle is represented by De La Salle Zobel (DLSZ) ever since it was admitted into the league in 1986.

Boys' sports
 Baseball (4) – 2011–12, 2013–14, 2014–15, 2016–17
 Basketball (8) – 1924–25, 1931–32, 1934–35, 1939–40, 1951–52, 1955–56, 2005–06, 2007–08
 Chess (4) – 1977–78, 1978–79, 1979–80, 1980–81
 Football (31) – 1924–25, 1926–27, 1927–28, 1928–29, 1929–30, 1932–33, 1933–34, 1934–35, 1935–36, 1937–38, 1938–39, 1939–40, 1940–41, 1941–42, 1948–49, 1949–50, 1955–56, 1957–58, 1960–61, 1966–67, 1967–68, 1968–69, 1969–70, 1971–72, 1972–73, 1974–75, 1975–76, 1976–77, 1979–80, 1980–81, 2007–08
 Softball (8) – 1966–67, 1967–68, 1970–71, 1971–72, 1972–73, 1973–74, 1974–75, 1980–81
 Swimming (10) – 1934–35, 1935–36, 1938–39, 1974–75, 1976–77, 1977–78, 1978–79, 1979–80, 1980–81, 2018–19
 Table Tennis (3) – 2015–16, 2019–20, 2022–23
 Tennis (9) – 1949–50, 1951–52, 1952–53, 1953–54, 1956–57, 1959–60, 1960–61, 1965–66, 1979–80
 Track and Field (14) – 1925–26, 1926–27, 1933–34, 1935–36, 1955–56, 1956–57, 1957–58, 1958–59, 1959–60, 1969–70, 1975–76, 1976–77, 1977–78, 1978–79
 Volleyball (14) – 1965–66, 1966–67, 1971–72, 1977–78, 1978–79, 1979–80, 1980–81, 1994–95, 1995–96, 1996–97, 1997–98, 1998–99, 1999-00, 2003–04

Girls' sports
 Swimming (3) – 2016–17, 2017–18, 2018–19
 Table Tennis (2) – 2015–16, 2019–20
 Volleyball (10) – 1994–95, 1995–96, 1996–97, 1997–98, 1998–99, 2002–03, 2010–11, 2011–12, 2012–13, 2018–19

Other notable athletic alumni
 Paeng Nepomuceno – Four-time World Cup of Bowling Champion 
 Luis Gabriel Moreno – Archery Gold medalist – 2014 Nanjing Summer Youth Olympics (first Filipino to win Gold in IOC Youth Olympics)  
 Stephen Fernandez – Taekwondo Bronze medalist – 1992 Barcelona Olympics; Taekwondo Gold – 1987 SEA Games
 John Paul Gomez – Chess grandmaster, Filipino Chess Champion (2008), 5-time Filipino World Chess Olympiad team member (2008–2018), 5-time UAAP MVP Award winner for chess and Season 71 (2008–09) UAAP Athlete of the Year
 Edna Ledesma-Asano – Dance Sport Blackpool World Champion – 2005; DLSAA Sports Achievement Awardee
 Marcus Araneta Valda – Individual Gold in Greco-Roman Wrestling – 2003 SEA Games; Individual Gold Freestyle Wrestling – 2003 and 2005 SEA Games; DLSAA Sports Achievement Awardee
 John Paul Lizardo – Men's TKD Finweight gold; DLSAA Sports Achievement Awardee
 Eric Buhain – Multiple Swimming Gold – 1985, 1991, and 1993 SEA Games; Olympian – 1992 Summer Olympics; Chairman, Philippine Sports Commission; Chairman, Philippine Games and Amusement Board
 Joseph Orillana – 2007 Baseball Philippines MVP and Best Pitcher; Baseball Team Gold; DLSAA Sports Achievement Awardee
 Liza del Rosario – Bowling Gold – 2005 SEA Games
 Poch Juinio – Alaska – 1996 PBA Grand Slam Champions; 2000 PBA All-Filipino Finals MVP
 Yeng Guiao – 2009 and 2019 Philippine National Basketball Team Head Coach; Multi-titled PBA championship coach
 Perry Ronquillo – 1998–99 PBA championship coach
 Aby Maraño – UAAP Season 74 and 75 Women's Volleyball Most Valuable Player, Philippine Volleyball Women's National Team Captain (2018-present)
 Mary Joy Baron – UAAP Season 79 Women's Volleyball Most Valuable Player, Philippine Volleyball Women's National Team Main Stay, 2019 ASEAN Grand Prix Best Middle Blocker (Leg 1 and Leg 2)
 Kim Kianna Dy – UAAP Season 78 Women’s Volleyball Final's MVP, Philippine Volleyball Women's National Team Main Stay

Enrique M. Razon Sports Center
The Enrique M. Razon Sports Center is a 10-story building that is the main sports facility of De La Salle University. The proud home of the multi-titled DLSU Green Archers and Lady Spikers was generously provided by De La Salle alumnus billionaire - Enrique M. Razon. The DLSU Sports Center was built in 1998 to replace the old Brother Athanasius Sports Complex demolished in 2000 to give way for the construction of the Don Enrique T. Yuchengco Hall. The DLSU Sports Center stands on a 3,155-square-meter (33,960 sqft) lot located at the corner of Fidel Reyes (formerly named Agno) and Noli Streets. It has an Olympic-sized pool and track and field oval with a balcony. It has several basketball and volleyball courts. It also has table tennis courts, a spacious dance and martial arts studio, and modern well-equipped weight training rooms. The sixth floor of the building is the location of the George T. Yang Performing Arts Studios. The sixth floor also houses the Gold's Gym Taft branch, which opened in late 2016.

Rivalry with Ateneo de Manila University

Rivalry with University of Santo Tomas

References

External links

Take Aim Sports
DLSU Office of Sports Development website

Former Philippine Basketball League teams
College sports teams in Metro Manila
De La Salle University Green Archers
De La Salle University
Former National Collegiate Athletic Association (Philippines) teams